The 2002 Richmond Spiders football team represented the University of Richmond during the 2002 NCAA Division I-AA football season. Richmond competed as a member of the Atlantic 10 Conference (A-10), and played their home games at the University of Richmond Stadium.

The Spiders were led by eighth-year head coach Jim Reid and finished the regular season with a 4–7 overall record and 4–5 record in conference play.

Schedule

  Game was suspended at halftime due to flooding on the field and resumed on October 27 at 11:45 a.m.

Roster

References

Richmond
Richmond Spiders football seasons
Richmond Spiders football